At the End of the Day is the fifth studio album from heavy metal band, Galactic Cowboys. Multiple reviewers found that the album contained subtle references to Christianity, but provided plenty of subtext to interpret meanings with.

Notes
The album contains the band's Machine Fish Suite, a series of songs woven together, telling the story of the band up to that point (tracks 4–10 inclusive).
Drummer Alan Doss does lead vocals on the song "Through".
The Japanese version of this album contained the song, "The Things They Couldn't Say", which was recorded in 1994, with lead vocals by then guitarist Dane Sonnier.

Track listing

Credits 
Ben Huggins – Vocals, guitar, blues harp
Wally Farkas – Guitar, vocals, keyboards
Monty Colvin – Vocals, bass 
Alan Doss – Drums, vocals

References

External links
At The End Of The Day lyrics

1998 albums
Galactic Cowboys albums